Aquilegia alpina, the alpine columbine or breath of God, is a species of flowering plant in the family Ranunculaceae, native to the Alps, where it is typically found growing on carbonate bedrock.

References

alpina
Flora of France
Flora of Switzerland
Flora of Austria
Flora of Italy
Taxa named by Carl Linnaeus
Plants described in 1753